Giacomo Almirante (1875–1944) was an Italian stage and film actor.

Life and career 
Born in Palermo, the brother of actors Ernesto and Luigi,  Almirante made his stage debut in 1891, and was mainly active on theatre, in which he worked, among others, with the Lyda Borelli, Dina Galli, Ermete Novelli, Renzo Ricci, Antonio Gandusio and Nino Besozzi companies. For about a decade he was also active in films as a character actor. He was married to the sister of actor Olinto Cristina.

Selected filmography
 Paradise (1932)
 Pergolesi (1932)
 I'll Give a Million (1936)
 Dora Nelson (1939)
 Saint John, the Beheaded (1940)
 A Romantic Adventure (1940)
 Teresa Venerdì (1941)
 Scampolo (1941)

References

External links

1875 births
1944 deaths
Italian male film actors
Italian male stage actors
Male actors from Palermo